Piz dal Ras (3,028 m) is a mountain of the Albula Alps, located in west of Susch in the canton of Graubünden.

References

External links
 Piz dal Ras on Hikr

Mountains of the Alps
Alpine three-thousanders
Mountains of Switzerland
Mountains of Graubünden
Zernez